Habib Khabiri (15 August 1954 – 21 June 1984) was an Iranian footballer and captain of the Iran national football team. He was arrested for membership of the People's Mojahedin Organisation of Iran in 1983. He was subsequently tortured and executed by shooting the following year. His brother, Mohammad, was also an Iranian international and vice-president of the Football Federation Islamic Republic of Iran.

References

External links

1954 births
1984 deaths
Iranian footballers
Iran international footballers
1980 AFC Asian Cup players
Homa F.C. players
20th-century executions by Iran
People's Mojahedin Organization of Iran members
Association football defenders
Iranian torture victims